Gone with the Wave is a soundtrack album to the surf film of the same name by Argentine composer, pianist and conductor Lalo Schifrin recorded in 1964 and released on the Colpix label.

Track listing
All compositions by Lalo Schifrin
 "Gone With the Wave" - 2:42 
 "Laniakea Waltz" - 3:19 
 "A Taste of Bamboo (Hula Twist)" - 2:00 
 "Halieva Blues" - 2:47 
 "Taco-Taquito" - 2:59 
 "Breaks" - 3:24 
 "Aqua Blues" - 3:09 
 "Surf Waltz" - 1:59 
 "Five by Four (Ala Moana)" - 2:57 
 "Breaks Bossa Nova" - 3:36 
 "Waimea Bay" - 2:12
Recorded in Los Angeles, California in October 1964

Personnel
Lalo Schifrin - arranger, conductor
Frank Rosolino - trombone
Paul Horn - alto saxophone, flute
Jackie Kelso - tenor saxophone
Victor Feldman - piano
Howard Roberts, Bob Bain, John Pisano, Laurindo Almeida, Jack Marshall - guitar
Joe Mondragon - bass
Shelly Manne - drums
Milt Holland, Francisco Aguabella - percussion

References

1964 soundtrack albums
Colpix Records albums
Lalo Schifrin soundtracks
Film scores
Albums conducted by Lalo Schifrin